Nordseth is a surname. Notable people with the surname include:

Iver G. Nordseth (born 1951), Norwegian politician
Trond Nordseth (born 1974), Norwegian footballer
Tore Nordseth (born 1966), Norwegian politician

Norwegian-language surnames